Chevy Chase is an incorporated town in Montgomery County, Maryland, United States. The population was 2,824 at the 2010 census. 

The town is part of a larger community, colloquially referred to as Chevy Chase, that includes several adjoining settlements in Montgomery County and one neighborhood of Washington.

Geography
The town of Chevy Chase is located at  (38.98061, -77.083822).

Demographics

2010 census
As of the census of 2010, there were 2,824 people, 1,003 households, and 835 families living in the town. The racial makeup of the town was 92.1% White, 1.0% African American, 0.1% Native American, 3.9% Asian, 0.7% from other races, and 2.2% from two or more races. Hispanic or Latino of any race were 4.7% of the population.

There were 1,003 households, of which 41.5% had children under the age of 18 living with them, 75.0% were married couples living together, 6.2% had a female householder with no husband present, 2.1% had a male householder with no wife present, and 16.7% were non-families. 13.6% of all households were made up of individuals, and 7.6% had someone living alone who was 65 years of age or older. The average household size was 2.82 and the average family size was 3.06.

The median age in the town was 46.3 years. 27.5% of residents were under the age of 18; 4.7% were between the ages of 18 and 24; 15.8% were from 25 to 44; 37.5% were from 45 to 64; and 14.4% were 65 years of age or older. The gender makeup of the town was 48.1% male and 51.9% female.

2000 census
As of the census of 2000, there were 2,726 people, 987 households, and 802 families living in the town. The racial makeup of the town was 95.01% White, 0.88% Black or African American, 0.04% Native American, 2.20% Asian, 0.04% Pacific Islander, 0.51% from other races, and 1.32% from two or more races. Hispanic or Latino of any race were 3.37% of the population.

There were 987 households, out of which 42.1% had children under the age of 18 living with them, 73.6% were married couples living together, 6.1% had a female householder with no husband present, and 18.7% were non-families. 14.9% of all households were made up of individuals, and 7.3% had someone living alone who was 65 years of age or older. The average household size was 2.76 and the average family size was 3.04.

In the town, the population was spread out, with 28.5% under the age of 18, 2.7% from 18 to 24, 22.3% from 25 to 44, 32.5% from 45 to 64, and 13.9% who were 65 years of age or older. The median age was 43 years. For every 100 females, there were 86.3 males. For every 100 females age 18 and over, there were 87.1 males.

The median income for a household in the town was $160,331, and the median income for a family was $167,790. Males had a median income of $100,000 versus $66,705 for females. The per capita income for the town was $70,325. About 0.9% of families and 2.1% of the population were below the poverty line, including 1.8% of those under age 18 and 3.9% of those age 65 or over.

Transportation

Three state highways form the northern, eastern and southern borders of the town, with a fourth lying just beyond the western border. Of the three highways directly bordering the town, the most prominent is Maryland Route 185 (Connecticut Avenue), which forms the eastern border of the town. MD 185 extends south to Washington, D.C. and north to the nearest Interstate highway, Interstate 495 (the Capital Beltway). From the north side of town, Maryland Route 410 extends eastward, providing local connections to many other suburban towns north and northeast of Washington, D.C. On the south edge of town, Maryland Route 191 extends west through Bethesda to Potomac. The fourth highway, lying just beyond the town's western edge, is Maryland Route 355 (Wisconsin Avenue), which provides many of the same connections as MD 185 does on a slightly more west alignment.

Education 

The town of Chevy Chase sends students to the Montgomery County Public Schools.

Residents are zoned to Rosemary Hills Elementary School (PreK-2) (unincorporated Montgomery County), North Chevy Chase Elementary School, Westbrook Elementary School, Chevy Chase Elementary School (3-6) (in the town of Chevy Chase), Westland Middle School (unincorporated Montgomery County) and Bethesda-Chevy Chase High School (unincorporated Montgomery County).

See also
 Chevy Chase Elementary School

References

External links

 
 

1918 establishments in Maryland
 
Populated places established in 1918
Suburbs of Washington, D.C.
Towns in Maryland
Towns in Montgomery County, Maryland